Despair is a state of depressed mood and hopelessness.

Despair may also refer to:
 Despair (sculpture), a c. 1890 sculpture by Auguste Rodin
 Despair (novel), a 1936 novel by Vladimir Nabokov
 Despair (film), a 1978 film adaptation by Rainer Fassbinder
 Despair (band), a thrash metal band
 Despair (DC Comics), a character in the Sandman comic book series
 Despair (album), an album by Omar Rodríguez-López
 Despair, Inc., a company that makes satirical posters and souvenirs
 Mount Despair (Washington), a mountain in the North Cascades National Park
 Giant Despair, a character in The Pilgrim's Progress by John Bunyan
 Despair, a 1969 underground comic by Robert Crumb
 "Despair", a song by the Yeah Yeah Yeahs from their studio album Mosquito, 2013
 Neka mi ne svane, Croatian Eurovision Song Contest entry from 1998, also known as "Despair".

See also 
 Diseases of despair
 Desperate (disambiguation)